Hemareddy Mallamma is a 1946 Indian Kannada-language film, directed by S. Soundarya Rajan and produced by Gubbi Veeranna. The film stars B. Jayamma, Honnappa Bhagavathar, Veeranna and C. B. Mallappa. The film has musical score by V. Nagayya.

Cast
 B. Jayamma as Mallamma
 Honnappa Bhagavathar
 Gubbi Veeranna as Hemareddy
 C. B. Mallappa
 K. R. Seetharama Sastry

Soundtrack
The music was composed by V. Nagayya.

See also 
 Mahasadhvi Mallamma

References

External links
 
  - A song by B. Jayamma

1940s Kannada-language films
Indian black-and-white films
Films scored by A. Rama Rao